Charles Mann Hamilton (January 23, 1874 – January 3, 1942) was an American politician from New York.

Life
Hamilton attended Ripley High School, the Fredonia Normal School (now the State University of New York at Fredonia), and the Pennsylvania Military College (now Widener University) in Chester, Pennsylvania.  He was active in farming, and was also involved in the oil and natural gas business.

A Republican, he was a member of the New York State Assembly (Chautauqua Co., 2nd D.) in 1907 and 1908.

He was a member of the New York State Senate (51st D.) from 1909 to 1912, sitting in the 132nd, 133rd, 134th and 135th New York State Legislatures.

Hamilton was elected as a Republican to the 63rd, 64th and 65th United States Congresses, holding office from March 4, 1913, to March 3, 1919; and was Minority Whip from 1915 to 1919.

He was not a candidate for reelection in 1918, and returned to his farming and business interests.

Hamilton died in Miami Beach, Florida on January 3, 1942.  He was buried at Quincy Rural Cemetery in Ripley.

Sources
 

1874 births
1942 deaths
Republican Party members of the New York State Assembly
Republican Party New York (state) state senators
People from Ripley, New York
Republican Party members of the United States House of Representatives from New York (state)